Security Force Auxiliaries  or Pfumo Re Vanhu were black private militias in Rhodesia formed during the Rhodesian Bush War, allied with the country's predominantly white government.

In 1978 the Rhodesian Special Branch created the first SFA in the Msana Tribal Trust Lands (TTL). While the Rhodesian government intended for them only to serve as pro-government, anti-Communist militias, author Matthew Preston argues they became Prime Minister Muzorewa and Ndabaningi Sithole's "private armies." By 1979 there were 2,000 auxiliaries. By April there were 10,000. Not only did the auxiliaries protect voters, but in some cities, such as Karoi, Chinamore and Seki, they fought and defeated the Patriotic Front. Like the Rhodesian security forces and their guerrilla opponents, SFAs used torture to extract information.

References

External links
 Security Force Auxiliaries

Non-military counterinsurgency organizations
Government paramilitary forces
Paramilitary forces of Rhodesia
Militias
Indigenous counterinsurgency forces